The Mortlock Shield Championship, known for commercial reasons as the Port Lincoln Bendigo Bank Mortlock Shield Championship and commonly known as just the Mortlock Shield is an annual Australian rules football competition based in Port Lincoln, South Australia. The competition takes place every year at Centenary Oval and it consists of a league with representative teams of leagues from the Eyre Peninsula and beyond. It is an affiliated competition of the South Australian National Football League (SANFL). The current champions are Great Flinders who beat Eastern Eyre in the grand final of the 2022 edition of the carnival

Brief history 
Named after William Tennant Mortlock, the Mortlock Shield began in 1936 when the football associations of Central Eyre, Cleve, Eastern Eyre, Great Flinders and Port Lincoln banded together to form a carnival for the best players in their respective leagues to compete in. Since 1994 The best players from the carnival are selected to play for Eyre Peninsula in the SA Country Football Championship.

Format 
The current format of the Mortlock Shield consists of a single round robin structure composed of 5 representative sides of football leagues from around the Eyre Peninsula. The carnival is held over two days on the Kings Birthday long weekend (Saturday and Monday). Each game is made of two halves of 20 minutes plus time on, if a game ends in a draw two halves of 5 minute extra time will be played. If teams are still tied golden goal will be applied. The top two teams on the ladder after four games play in the grand final, where the winner is awarded the perpetual Mortlock Shield to commemorate their win.

List of Champions 
List of Mortlock Shield Champions.

 1936 Great Flinders
 1939 Eastern Eyre
 1947 Port Lincoln 1
 1949 Le Hunte
 1951 Great Flinders
 1953 Port Lincoln
 1955 Great Flinders
 1956 Great Flinders
 1957 Great Flinders
 1958 Eastern Eyre
 1959 Great Flinders 
 1960 Far West
 1961 Port Lincoln
 1962 Port Lincoln
 1963 County Jervois 
 1964 Lincoln City
 1965 Lincoln City
 1966 County Jervois

 1967 Lincoln City
 1968 Lincoln Districts
 1969 Far West
 1970 Lincoln City
 1971 Lincoln Districts
 1972 Great Flinders
 1973 Le Hunte
 1974 Great Flinders
 1975 Great Flinders
 1976 Great Flinders
 1977 Lincoln Districts
 1978 Great Flinders
 1979 Lincoln Districts
 1980 Great Flinders
 1981 Lincoln Districts
 1982 Great Flinders
 1983 Far West
 1984 Far West

 1985 Lincoln Districts
 1986 Far West
 1987 Lincoln Districts 
 1988 Far West
 1989 Eastern Eyre 
 1990 Far West
 1991 Eastern Eyre
 1992 Great Flinders
 1993 Great Flinders
 1994 Lincoln Districts 
 1995 Eastern Eyre
 1996 Great Flinders
  1997 Mid West
 1998 Great Flinders
 1999 Lincoln Districts
 2000 Mid West 
 2001 Great Flinders
 2002 Great Flinders 

 2003 Mid West
 2004 Lincoln City
 2005 Mid West
 2006 Great Flinders
 2007 Great Flinders
 2008 Great Flinders
 2009 Port Lincoln
 2010 Port Lincoln
 2011 Port Lincoln
 2012 Lincoln City
 2013 Great Flinders
 2014 Great Flinders
 2015 EP Sharks
 2016 Eastern Eyre
 2017 Lincoln City
 2018 EP Sharks
 2019 Great Flinders
 2020 Competition cancelled due to COVID-19 pandemic
 2021 Great Flinders
 2022 Great Flinders

Current Teams

2017 Ladder

2018 Ladder

2019 Ladder

2021 Ladder

2022 ladder

Norwood Cup
The Norwood Cup, formally North Adelaide Shield and Port Adelaide Cup is an Under-15's mixed Competition ran on the Saturday between the Mortlock Shield. The cup is sponsored by the Norwood Football Club who compete in the SANFL as the Eyre Peninsula falls under their academy zone which is in place to develop youth football to professional level in South Australia.

References

Australian rules football competitions in South Australia
Recurring events established in 1936
1936 establishments in Australia